
Year 614 (DCXIV) was a common year starting on Tuesday (link will display the full calendar) of the Julian calendar. The denomination 614 for this year has been used since the early medieval period, when the Anno Domini calendar era became the prevalent method in Europe for naming years.

Events 
 By place 

 Byzantine Empire 
 Byzantine–Sasanian War of 602–628:
 The Levantine cities of Caesarea Maritima, Arsuf, and Tiberias surrender on terms to the Sasanians.
 Sasanian conquest of Jerusalem: A Persian–Jewish army (26,000 men) commanded by Shahrbaraz captures and sacks Jerusalem, after a 20-day siege. Somewhere between 57,000 and 66,500 citizens are slain; another 35,000 are enslaved, including the Patriarch Zacharias. Many churches in the city (including the "Church of the Resurrection" or Holy Sepulchre) are burned, and numerous relics, including the True Cross, the Holy Lance, and the Holy Sponge, are carried off to the Persian capital Ctesiphon. 
 The Persians destroy the Ghassanid Kingdom (Arabia), a vassal state of the Byzantine Empire (approximate date).

 Europe 
 October 18 – King Chlothar II promulgates the Edict of Paris (Edictum Chlotacharii), a sort of Frankish Magna Carta that defends the rights of the Frankish nobles and the church, and regulates the appointment of counts (secular officials in charge of law courts, collecting taxes, and assembling contingents for the army), while it excludes Jews from all civil employment in the Frankish Kingdom.S. Wise Bauer, "The History of the Medieval World: From the Conversion of Constantine to the First Crusade", W.W. Norton & Company, 2010), p. 251
 The Palace of Diocletian in Split (Croatia) is damaged by the Avars, who sack the nearby city of Salona. The population flees to the walled palace, which is able to hold out.

 Britain 
 Battle of Bampton: King Cynegils of Wessex defeats the invading Britons in Dumnonia (modern Devon). They use the Roman road eastward from Exeter to Dorchester, and are intercepted by the West Saxons marching south.

 By topic 
 Religion 
 The Sudarium of Oviedo is taken from Palestine, after the invasion of the Sassanid Persians.

Other 
 First year that didn't happen, according to the phantom time hypothesis.

Births 
 Eanswith, Anglo-Saxon princess (approximate date)
 Fujiwara no Kamatari, founder of the Fujiwara clan (d. 669)
 Hilda of Whitby, abbess and saint (approximate date)  
 Li Yifu, chancellor of the Tang dynasty (d. 666)
 Rictrude, Frankish abbess (approximate date)
 General Xue Rengui of the Tang dynasty (d. 683)

Deaths 
 January 13 – Mungo, Brythonic apostle and saint
 Philippicus, Byzantine general (approximate date)
 Queen Sado

References

Sources